Miss Universe Canada 2018, the 16th Miss Universe Canada pageant, was held on August 18, 2018 at John Bassett Theatre, Metro Toronto Convention Centre, Toronto. Lauren Howe of Ontario Province crowned Marta Stepien of South Ontario at the end of the event. The first runner-up represented Canada at Miss International 2018 and the second runner-up represented the country in Reinado Internacional del Café 2019.

Final results

Special Awards

Official Delegates
Meet the 60 national delegates competing for the title of Miss Universe Canada 2018:

References

External links
Official Website

2018
2018 in Toronto
2018 beauty pageants